This list of taekwondo grandmasters includes notable persons who have been recognized as grandmasters of the Korean martial art of taekwondo. There is no single, universally-recognized set of criteria to define a taekwondo grandmaster; different organizations and different styles have their own rules. Those listed below are grouped by system: Kukkiwon (widely known as the World Taekwondo Headquarters), International Taekwon-Do Federation (ITF), and other systems (which includes some persons receiving ranks from taekwondo organizations that predate the other two systems, e.g., the original Korea Taekwondo Association (KTA)) and United Taekwondo Association UWTA.

Kukkiwon (World Taekwondo Headquarters)
This list includes persons who:
 are ranked at least 9th -10th depending school dan by Kukkiwon (the highest rank normally awarded to living persons within that system);
 are notable as individuals; and
 are notable for their contribution to taekwondo.

Gerard van den Berg 
9th Dan  
02-04-1957
Leiden
Netherlands
Grandmaster Gerard van den Berg Was on June 15, 2022  the first born Dutchman, Taekwondoka who has take an exam for the 9th Dan in the Kukkiwon Seoul Korea.
http://www.taekwondoleiden.nl

International Taekwon-Do Federation (ITF)
This list includes persons who:
 are ranked 9th dan by the ITF (and thus officially recognised as 'Grand Masters' within that system);
 are notable as individuals; and
 are notable for their contribution to taekwondo.

Other taekwondo systems
This list includes persons who:
 have been widely recognized masters of taekwondo for at least 30 years;
 are notable as individuals; and
 are notable for their contribution to taekwondo.

See also 
 Original masters of taekwondo

References 

Taekwondo-related lists
Lists of martial artists